Capsicum is a genus of flowering plants in the nightshade family Solanaceae, native to the Americas, cultivated worldwide for their chili pepper or bell pepper fruit.

Etymology and names

The generic name may come from Latin , meaning 'box', presumably alluding to the pods; or possibly from the Greek word  , 'to gulp'. The name "pepper" comes from the similarity of piquance (spiciness or "heat") of the flavor to that of black pepper, Piper nigrum, although there is no botanical relationship with it or with Sichuan pepper. The original term, chilli (now chile in Mexico) came from the Nahuatl word chīlli, denoting a larger Capsicum variety cultivated at least since 3000 BC, as evidenced by remains found in pottery from Puebla and Oaxaca. Different varieties were cultivated in South America, where they are known as ajíes (singular ají), from the Quechua term for Capsicum.

The fruit (technically berries in the strict botanical sense) of Capsicum plants have a variety of names depending on place and type. The more piquant varieties are commonly called chili peppers, or simply chilis. The large, mild form is called bell pepper, or by color or both (green pepper, green bell pepper, red bell pepper, etc.) in North America and South Africa, sweet pepper or simply pepper in the United Kingdom, Ireland and Malaysia, but typically called capsicum in Australia, India, New Zealand and Singapore.

Capsicum fruits of several varieties with commercial value are called by various European-language names in English, such as jalapeño, peperoncini, and peperoncito; many of these are usually sold pickled. Paprika (in English) refers to a powdered spice made of dried Capsicum of several sorts, though in Hungary, Germany, Sweden, Finland and some other countries it is the name of the fruit (or the vegetable) as well.  Both whole and powdered chili are frequent ingredients in dishes prepared throughout the world, and characteristic of several cuisine styles, including Mexican, Sichuan (Szechuan) Chinese, Korean, Cajun and Creole, along with most South Asian and derived (e.g. Jamaican) curries. The powdered form is a key ingredient in various commercially prepared foodstuffs, such as pepperoni (a sausage), chili con carne (a meat stew), and hot sauces.

Taxonomy
Capiscum are solanaceous plants within the tribe Capsiceae, and are closely related to Lycianthes. Work by Olmstead et. al, have proposed the following phylogenetic tree for Capsicum

Solanaceae
Solanoideae
 Capsiceae
Capsicum
See species list
Lycianthes
Nicotianoideae

Growing conditions
Ideal growing conditions for peppers include a sunny position with warm, loamy soil, ideally , that is moist but not waterlogged. Extremely moist soils can cause seedlings to "damp-off" and reduce germination.

For flowering, Capsicum is a non-photoperiod-sensitive crop. The flowers can self-pollinate. However, at extremely high temperature, pollen loses viability, and flowers are much less likely to result in fruit.

Species and varieties

Capsicum consists of 20–27 species, five of which are widely cultivated: C. annuum, C. baccatum, C. chinense, C. frutescens, and C. pubescens. Phylogenetic relationships between species have been investigated using biogeographical, morphological, chemosystematic, hybridization, and genetic data.  Fruits of Capsicum can vary tremendously in color, shape, and size both between and within species, which has led to confusion over the relationships among taxa. Chemosystematic studies helped distinguish the difference between varieties and species. For example, C. baccatum var. baccatum had the same flavonoids as C. baccatum var. pendulum, which led researchers to believe the two groups belonged to the same species.

Many varieties of the same species can be used in many different ways; for example, C. annuum includes the "bell pepper" variety, which is sold in both its immature green state and its red, yellow, or orange ripe state. This same species has other varieties, as well, such as the Anaheim chiles often used for stuffing, the dried ancho (before being dried it is referred to as a poblano) chile used to make chili powder, the mild-to-hot, ripe jalapeno used to make smoked jalapeno, known as chipotle.

Peru is thought to be the country with the highest cultivated Capsicum diversity since varieties of all five domesticates are commonly sold in markets in contrast to other countries. Bolivia is considered to be the country where the largest diversity of wild Capsicum peppers are consumed. Bolivian consumers distinguish two basic forms: ulupicas, species with small round fruits including C. eximium, C. cardenasii, C. eshbaughii, and C. caballeroi landraces; and arivivis, with small elongated fruits including C. baccatum var. baccatum and C. chacoense varieties.

The amount of capsaicin is measured in Scoville heat units (SHU) and this value varies significantly among Capsicum varieties. For example, a typical Bell pepper has a value of zero SHU and a Jalapeño has a value of 4000–8000 SHU. In 2017, the Guinness Book of World Records listed the Carolina Reaper as the world's hottest pepper at 1,641,183 SHU, according to tests conducted by Winthrop University in South Carolina, United States.

Species list
Sources:

 Capsicum annuum L.
 glabriusculum var.
 New Mexico Group
 Capsicum baccatum L.
 Capsicum benoistii Hunz. ex Barboza
  Hunz.
  Barboza & Agra
  M. Nee
  Sendtn.
  Barboza & Bianch.
 Capsicum cardenasii Heiser & P. G. Sm.
  M. Nee
 Capsicum chacoense Hunz.
 Capsicum chinense Jacq.
 Capsicum coccineum (Rusby) Hunz.
  (Hiern) Hunz.
 Capsicum dimorphum (Miers) Kuntze
 Capsicum dusenii Bitter
 Capsicum eshbaughii Barboza
 Capsicum eximium Hunz.
 Capsicum flexuosum Sendtn.
  Bianch. & Barboza
 Capsicum frutescens L.
  Hunz.
 Capsicum geminifolium (Dammer) Hunz.
 Capsicum havanense Kunth
 Capsicum hookerianum (Miers) Kuntze
   Bianch. & Barboza
  (Greenm.) C.V.Morton & Standl.
 Capsicum leptopodum (Dunal) Kuntze
  Agra & Barboza
  Barboza & S. Leiva
 Capsicum lycianthoides Bitter
 Capsicum minutiflorum (Rusby) Hunz.
 Capsicum mirabile Mart. ex Sendtn.
 Capsicum mositicum Toledo
 Capsicum neei Barboza & X. Reyes
 Capsicum parvifolium Sendtn.
   Bianch. & Barboza
 Capsicum pubescens Ruiz & Pav.
  S. Leiva & Barboza
 Capsicum praetermissum Heiser & Smith
 Capsicum ramosissimum  Witasek
   Witasek
 Capsicum regale  Barboza & Bohs
 Capsicum rhomboideum (Dunal) Kuntze
  Sendtn.
 Capsicum scolnikianum Hunz.
 Capsicum spina-alba  (Dunal) Kuntze
 Capsicum stramoniifolium  (Kunth) Standl.
  Eshbaugh et al.
  Sendtn.

Formerly placed here
 Tubocapsicum anomalum (Franch. & Sav.) Makino (as C. anomalum Franch. & Sav.)
 Vassobia fasciculata (Miers) Hunz. (as C. grandiflorum Kuntze)
 Witheringia stramoniifolia Kunth (as C. stramoniifolium (Kunth) Kuntze)

Genetics
Most Capsicum species are 2n=2x=24.  A few of the non-domesticated species are 2n=2x=32. All are diploid. The Capsicum annuum and Capsicum chinense genomes were completed in 2014. The Capsicum annuum genome is approximately 3.48 Gb, making it larger than the human genome. Over 75% of the pepper genome is composed of transposable elements, mostly Gypsy elements, distributed widely throughout the genome. The distribution of transposable elements is inversely correlated with gene density. Pepper is predicted to have 34,903 genes, approximately the same number as both tomato and potato, two related species within the family Solanaceae.

Breeding
Many types of peppers have been bred for heat, size, and yield. Along with selection of specific fruit traits such as flavor and color, specific pest, disease and abiotic stress resistances are continually being selected. Breeding occurs in several environments dependent on the use of the final variety including but not limited to: conventional, organic, hydroponic, green house and shade house production environments.

Several breeding programs are being conducted by corporations and universities. In the United States, New Mexico State University has released several varieties in the last few years. Cornell University has worked to develop regionally adapted varieties that work better in cooler, damper climates. Other universities such as UC Davis, University of Wisconsin-Madison, and Oregon State University have smaller breeding programs. Many vegetable seed companies breed different types of peppers as well.

Capsaicin

The fruit of most species of Capsicum contains capsaicin (methyl-n-vanillyl nonenamide), a lipophilic chemical that can produce a burning sensation (pungency or spiciness) in the mouth of the eater. Most mammals find this unpleasant, whereas birds are unaffected. The secretion of capsaicin protects the fruit from consumption by insects and mammals, while the bright colors attract birds that will disperse the seeds.

Capsaicin is present in large quantities in the placental tissue (which holds the seeds), the internal membranes, and to a lesser extent, the other fleshy parts of the fruits of plants in this genus. The seeds themselves do not produce any capsaicin, although the highest concentration of capsaicin can be found in the white pith around the seeds. Most of the capsaicin in a pungent (hot) pepper is concentrated in blisters on the epidermis of the interior ribs (septa) that divide the chambers, or locules, of the fruit to which the seeds are attached.

A study on capsaicin production in fruits of C. chinense showed that capsaicinoids are produced only in the epidermal cells of the interlocular septa of pungent fruits, that blister formation only occurs as a result of capsaicinoid accumulation, and that pungency and blister formation are controlled by a single locus, Pun1, for which there exist at least two recessive alleles that result in non-pungency of C. chinense fruits.

The amount of capsaicin in the fruit is highly variable and dependent on genetics and environment, giving almost all types of Capsicum varied amounts of perceived heat.  The most recognized Capsicum without capsaicin is the bell pepper, a cultivar of Capsicum annuum, which has a zero rating on the Scoville scale. The lack of capsaicin in bell peppers is due to a recessive gene that eliminates capsaicin and, consequently, the hot taste usually associated with the rest of the genus Capsicum. There are also other peppers without capsaicin, mostly within the Capsicum annuum species, such as the cultivars Giant Marconi, Yummy Sweets, Jimmy Nardello, and Italian Frying peppers (also known as the Cubanelle).

Chili peppers are of great importance in the medicine of Indigenous peoples, and capsaicin is used in modern medicine mainly in topical medications as a circulatory stimulant and analgesic. In more recent times, an aerosol extract of capsaicin, usually known as capsicum or pepper spray, has become used by law enforcement as a nonlethal means of incapacitating a person, and in a more widely dispersed form for riot control, or by individuals for personal defense.  Pepper in vegetable oils, or as an horticultural product can be used in gardening as a natural insecticide.

Although black pepper causes a similar burning sensation, it is caused by a different substance—piperine.

Cuisine

Capsicum fruits can be eaten raw or cooked. Those used in cooking are generally varieties of the C. annuum and C. frutescens species, though a few others are used, as well. They are suitable for stuffing with fillings such as cheese, meat, or rice.

They are also frequently used both chopped and raw in salads, or cooked in stir-fries or other mixed dishes. They can be sliced into strips and fried, roasted whole or in pieces, or chopped and incorporated into salsas or other sauces, of which they are often a main ingredient.

They can be preserved in the form of a jam, or by drying, pickling, or freezing. Dried Capsicum may be reconstituted whole, or processed into flakes or powders. Pickled or marinated Capsicum are frequently added to sandwiches or salads. Frozen Capsicum are used in stews, soups, and salsas. Extracts can be made and incorporated into hot sauces.

The Spanish conquistadores soon became aware of their culinary properties, and brought them back to Europe, together with cocoa, potatoes, sweet potatoes, tobacco, maize, beans, and turkeys. They also brought it to the Spanish Philippines colonies, whence it spread to Asia. The Portuguese brought them to their African and Asiatic possessions such as India. All varieties were appreciated but the hot ones were particularly appreciated, because they could enliven an otherwise monotonous diet during times of dietary restriction, such as during religious observances.

Spanish cuisine soon benefited from the discovery of chiles in the New World, and it would become very difficult to untangle Spanish cooking from chiles. Ground chiles, or paprika, hot or otherwise, are a key ingredient in chorizo, which is then called picante (if hot chile is added) or dulce (if otherwise). Paprika is also an important ingredient in rice dishes, and plays a definitive role in squid Galician style (polbo á feira). Chopped chiles are used in fish or lamb dishes such as ajoarriero or chilindrón. Pisto is a vegetarian stew with chilies and zucchini as main ingredients. They can also be added, finely chopped, to gazpacho as a garnish. In some regions, bacon is salted and dusted in paprika for preservation. Cheese can also be rubbed with paprika to lend it flavour and colour. Dried round chiles called ñoras are used for arroz a banda.

After being introduced by the Portuguese, chile peppers saw widespread adoption throughout South, Southeast, and East Asia, especially in India, Thailand, Vietnam, China, and Korea. Several new cultivars were developed in these countries, and their use in combination with (or as a substitute for) existing 'hot' culinary spices such as black pepper and Sichuan pepper spread rapidly, giving rise to the modern forms a number of staple dishes such as Channa masala, Tom yum, Laziji, and Kimchi. This would in turn influence Anglo-Indian and American Chinese cuisine, most notably with the development of British and American forms of curry powder (based on Indian spice preparations such as Garam masala), and dishes such as General Tso's Chicken and Chicken Tikka Masala.

According to Richard Pankhurst, C. frutescens (known as barbaré) was so important to the national cuisine of Ethiopia, at least as early as the 19th century, "that it was cultivated extensively in the warmer areas wherever the soil was suitable." Although it was grown in every province, barbaré was especially extensive in Yejju, "which supplied much of Showa, as well as other neighbouring provinces." He mentions the upper Golima River valley as being almost entirely devoted to the cultivation of this plant, where it was harvested year-round.

In 2005, a poll of 2,000 people revealed the capsicum to be Britain's fourth-favourite culinary vegetable.

In Hungary, sweet yellow capsicum – along with tomatoes – are the main ingredient of lecsó.

In Bulgaria, South Serbia, and North Macedonia, capsicum are very popular, too. They can be eaten in salads, like shopska salata; fried and then covered with a dip of tomato paste, onions, garlic, and parsley; or stuffed with a variety of products, such as minced meat and rice, beans, or cottage cheese and eggs. Capsicum are also the main ingredient in the traditional tomato and capsicum dip lyutenitsa and ajvar. They are in the base of different kinds of pickled vegetables dishes, turshiya.

Capsicum is also used widely in Italian cuisine, and the hot species are used all around the southern part of Italy as a common spice (sometimes served with olive oil). Capsicums are used in many dishes; they can be cooked by themselves in a variety of ways (roasted, fried, deep-fried) and are a fundamental ingredient for some delicatessen specialities, such as nduja.

Capsicums are also used extensively in Sri Lanka cuisine as side dishes.

The Maya and Aztec people of Mesoamerica used Capsicum fruit in cocoa drinks as a flavouring.

In New Mexico, there is a capsicum annuum cultivar group called the New Mexico chile which is a mainstay of the state's New Mexican cuisine.

GRAS
Only Capsicum frutescens L. and Capsicum annuum L. are Generally recognized as safe.

Synonyms and common names

The name given to the Capsicum fruits varies between English-speaking countries.

In Australia, New Zealand and India, heatless varieties are called "capsicums", while hot ones are called "chilli"/"chillies" (double L). Pepperoncini are also known as "sweet capsicum". The term "bell peppers" is never used, although C. annuum and other varieties which have a bell shape and are fairly hot, are often called "bell chillies".

In Canada, Ireland, South Africa and the United Kingdom, the heatless varieties are commonly known simply as "peppers" (or more specifically "green peppers", "red peppers", etc.), while the hot ones are "chilli"/"chillies" (double L) or "chilli peppers".

In the United States, the common heatless varieties are referred to as "bell peppers", "sweet peppers", "red/green/etc. peppers", or simply "peppers", while the hot varieties are collectively called "chile"/"chiles", "chili"/"chilies", or "chili"/"chile peppers" (one L only), "hot peppers", or named as a specific variety (e.g., banana pepper).

In Polish and in Hungarian, the term papryka and paprika (respectively) is used for all kinds of capsicums (the sweet vegetable, and the hot spicy), as well as for dried and ground spice made from them (named paprika in both U.S. English and Commonwealth English). Also, fruit and spice can be attributed as papryka ostra (hot pepper) or papryka słodka (sweet pepper). In Polish, the term pieprz (pepper) instead means only grains or ground black pepper (incl. the green, white, and red forms), but not capsicum. Sometimes, the hot capsicum spice is also called chilli. Similarly, Hungarian uses the word bors for the black pepper.

In Czech and Slovak, the term paprika is too used for all kinds of capsicums. For black pepper, Czech uses pepř, while Slovak uses čierne korenie (literally, black spice) or, dialectally, piepor.

In Italy and the Italian- and German-speaking parts of Switzerland, the sweet varieties are called peperone and the hot varieties peperoncino (literally "small pepper"). In Germany, the heatless varieties as well as the spice are called Paprika and the hot types are primarily called Peperoni or Chili while in Austria, Pfefferoni is more common for these; in Dutch, this word is also used exclusively for bell peppers, whereas chilli is reserved for powders, and hot pepper variants are referred to as Spaanse pepers (Spanish peppers). In Switzerland, though, the condiment powder made from capsicum is called Paprika (German language regions) and paprica (French and Italian language region). In French, capsicum is called poivron for sweet varieties and piment for hot ones.

Spanish-speaking countries use many different names for the varieties and preparations. In Mexico, the term chile is used for "hot peppers", while the heatless varieties are called pimiento (the masculine form of the word for pepper, which is pimienta).  Several other countries, such as Chile (whose name is unrelated), Perú, the Dominican Republic, Puerto Rico, and Argentina, use ají. In Spain, heatless varieties are called pimiento and hot varieties guindilla. In Argentina and Spain, the variety C. chacoense is commonly known as "putaparió", a slang expression equivalent to "damn it", probably due to its extra-hot flavour.

In Brazil, the word "pimentão" is used for the large sweet varieties and "pimenta" for the smaller hot chillies. Black/white pepper (peppercorns or ground) is usually called "pimenta-do-reino". The different varieties of chillies may have compound names, such as "pimenta malagueta" for a certain type of fairly hot peppers.

In Indian English, the word "capsicum" is used exclusively for Capsicum annuum. All other varieties of hot capsicum are called chilli. In northern India and Pakistan, C. annuum is also commonly called shimla mirch in the local language and as "Kodai Mozhagai" in Tamil which roughly translates to "umbrella chilli" due to its appearance. Shimla, incidentally, is a popular hill-station in India (and mirch means chilli in local languages).

In Japanese, tōgarashi (唐辛子, トウガラシ "Chinese mustard") refers to hot chili peppers, and particularly a spicy powder made from them which is used as a condiment, while bell peppers are called pīman (ピーマン, from the French piment or the Spanish pimiento).

Pictures of common cultivars

See also

List of Capsicum cultivars
 List of vegetables
New Mexico chile
Pimento
Scoville scale

References

External links

 Capsicum pepper factsheet from Purdue Guide to Medicinal and Aromatic Plants
 Capsicums: Innovative Uses of an Ancient Crop History, Botany, Breeding, and Pungency. Purdue University, Indiana, U.S.A.
 
 Capsicum and Chillies: Commercial Cultivation  DPI&F Queensland, Australia.

 
Crops originating from the Americas
Indian spices
Fruit vegetables
Solanaceae genera